Lesbian, gay, bisexual and transgender (LGBT) rights in Portugal improved substantially in the 2000s and 2010s and are now among the best in the world. After a long period of oppression during the Estado Novo, Portuguese society has become increasingly accepting of homosexuality, which was decriminalized in 1982, eight years after the Carnation Revolution. Portugal has wide-ranging anti-discrimination laws and is one of the few countries in the world to contain a ban on discrimination based on sexual orientation in its Constitution. On 5 June 2010, the state became the eighth in the world to recognize same-sex marriage. On 1 March 2011, a gender identity law, said to be one of the most advanced in the world, was passed to simplify the process of sex and name change for transgender people. Same-sex couples have been permitted to adopt since 1 March 2016.

The country, while still influenced by Roman Catholicism, has progressively become more accepting of same-sex relationships and homosexuality. The 2019 Eurobarometer opinion survey showed that 74% of the Portuguese population supported same-sex marriage and that around 80% believed lesbian, gay and bisexual people should enjoy the same rights as heterosexuals. Lisbon, Porto and Faro have visible LGBT scenes, with several gay bars, nightclubs and other venues, as well as their annual pride parades.

Legality of same-sex sexual activity
During the period of the Portuguese Inquisition, female homosexual activity was not actively prosecuted due to a 1645 ruling; one of the few cases of prosecuting a woman (Maria Duran) for same-sex sexual activity came in 1741, but she was prosecuted for causing distress to her sexual partners, not for her activity. Same-sex sexual activity was first decriminalised in 1852, under Mary II and Ferdinand II of the Kingdom of Portugal, but it was made a crime again in 1886, under Louis I, and Portugal gradually became more oppressive of homosexuals until and throughout the dictatorship years. It was not until 1982 that same-sex sexual activity was decriminalised again, and the age of consent was equalized with heterosexual activity at 14 years of age in 2007.

Recognition of same-sex relationships

Portugal has recognized unregistered cohabitation since 5 May 2001, and same-sex marriage since 5 June 2010. Same-sex marriage was legalized under the second term of the Sócrates Socialist Government, and passed the Portuguese Parliament with the support of other leftist parties. Same-sex married couples are granted all of the rights of different-sex married couples. The Penal Code was amended in 2007 to equalize the age of consent and to criminalize domestic violence in same-sex relationships, thus equalizing treatment with opposite-sex couples.

Adoption and family planning

Since 2016, Portuguese law has allowed adoption of children by same-sex couples. Prior to that reform, same-sex couples were barred from adopting and informally forbidden from fostering children, although there had been several court rulings allowing children to live with same-sex families.

In the past, Portugal had been forced to pay a fine due to homophobic statements from a court that ruled against a gay father's right for his daughter's custody. The European Court of Human Rights received the case and ruled in favour of the father in 1999, demanding the custody back to him and issuing a penalty for the country.

On 17 May 2013, Parliament rejected a bill allowing same-sex couples to adopt children, in a 104–77 vote. On the same day, Parliament approved a bill, in its first reading, allowing same-sex married couples to adopt their partner's children (i.e. stepchild adoption). However, that bill was rejected in its second reading on 14 March 2014, in a 107–112 vote. Other bills granting adoption rights to same-sex parents and carers, as well as in vitro fertilisation (IVF) for lesbian relationships, were introduced in Parliament by the opposition Socialist and Left Bloc parties on 16 January 2015. On 22 January, Parliament rejected the proposals.

On 23 September 2015, parties from the Left majority in Parliament submitted bills to grant same-sex couples full adoption rights as well as access to IVF. On 20 November 2015, five proposals regarding adoption rights were approved by Parliament in their first readings. The bills were then moved to the Constitutional Affairs, Rights, Freedoms and Guarantees Committee, where they were merged into one project and approved on 16 December 2015. On 18 December 2015, the bill was approved by Parliament. On 25 January 2016, one day after the presidential election, outgoing President Aníbal Cavaco Silva vetoed the adoption bill. The Left majority in Parliament announced their intention to override the veto. On 10 February 2016, the veto was overturned by Parliament. The President begrudgingly signed the bill into law on 19 February 2016. The law was published in the official journal on 29 February, and took effect the first day of the first month after its publication (i.e. 1 March 2016).

On 13 May 2016, Parliament adopted a bill to grant female same-sex couples access to medically assisted reproduction. It was signed into law by President Marcelo Rebelo de Sousa on 7 June. The law was published in the official journal on 20 June and took effect the first day of the second month after publication (i.e. 1 August 2016).

Surrogacy was explicitly banned under a law adopted in 2006. In 2016, the Portuguese Parliament passed a law allowing gestational surrogacy under limited circumstances, such as when a woman is born without a uterus or has a serious illness that affects her uterus. Surrogacy, under any of its forms, is still illegal for same-sex couples.

Discrimination protections and hate crime laws
In 2003, laws against discrimination based on sexual orientation in employment came into effect concerning three particular measures: access to work and employment, protection against discrimination in work and against sexual harassment. Since 2004, the Constitution of Portugal has prohibited any form of discrimination based on sexual orientation, making Portugal one of the only countries in the world to enshrine a ban on discrimination based on sexual orientation in its Constitution. A new Penal Code came into force in 2007, strengthening the anti-discrimination legislation much further. The Penal Code contains several provisions that relate to sexual orientation in three aspects: recognition of same-sex relationships through protection in the same means as to different-sex relationships, such as against domestic violence and murder; equal age of consent between same-sex and opposite-sex relationships; and sexual orientation being considered an aggravating circumstance in homicide and hate crime cases. Article 13 of the Portuguese Constitution reads as follows:

In 2013, the Portuguese Parliament passed a law adding gender identity to the hate crimes provision in the Penal Code. On 19 January 2015, the Portuguese Parliament voted for the inclusion of gender identity as a protected ground of discrimination in the field of employment.

In 2015, the Portuguese Parliament unanimously approved a measure to formally adopt 17 May as the "National Day Against Homophobia and Transphobia". In doing so, the Parliament committed to "engage in fulfilling national and international commitments to combat homophobic and transphobic discrimination".

In 2020, ILGA Portugal recorded 41 cases of discrimination directed at LGBT people and 48 instances of hate crimes. In December 2020, the Court of Arbitration for Sport fined the Portuguese Football Federation €1,000 and ordered them to play four games behind closed doors (each game behind closed doors costing between €10,000 and €25,000) for homophobic insults hurled by fans during a match in October 2018. A survey from December 2020 showed that 79% of young people had witnessed incidents of anti-LGBT bullying and 86% thought that schools should better address LGBT topics.

Transgender and intersex rights
Discrimination against transgender and intersex people is illegal in Portugal.

In March 2011, President Aníbal Cavaco Silva ratified the new Law of Gender Identity, which allows transgender persons to change their legal gender on birth certificates and other identity documents.

On 24 May 2016, the Left Bloc introduced a bill to allow legal gender change solely based on self-determination. Similar bills were introduced by the People–Animals–Nature party and the Costa Government in November 2016 and May 2017, respectively. They were merged into one measure by a parliamentary committee and subsequently approved by the Parliament on 13 April 2018. On 9 May, President Marcelo Rebelo de Sousa vetoed the bill. On 12 July, the Parliament adopted the bill with changes with regards to sex changes by minors aged 16 and 17, suggested by the President in his veto message. This time around, the President signed the bill on 31 July. It was published in the official journal on 7 August 2018 and took effect the following day.

The law (Act No. 38/2018) allows an adult person to change their legal gender without any requirements. Minors aged 16 and 17 are able to do so with parental consent and a psychological opinion, confirming that their decision has been taken freely and without any outside pressure. The law also prohibits both direct and indirect discrimination based on gender identity, gender expression and sex characteristics, and bans non-consensual sex assignment treatment and surgical intervention on intersex children. By October 2018, a total of 274 people, including 21 minors, had used the new gender recognition law to change their legal gender.

In July 2019, the Minister of Science, Technology and Higher Education, Manuel Heitor, issued recommendations for universities to amend the certificates of transgender people to properly reflect their gender identity. Similarly, that same month, Education Minister Tiago Brandão Rodrigues published regulations for primary and secondary schools to facilitate transgender and intersex students. This includes using the student's preferred name, raising awareness, and training staff to handle discrimination cases and bullying.

Military service
Portugal allows all citizens to serve openly in the Armed Forces regardless of sexual orientation, as the Constitution explicitly forbids any discrimination on that basis. Lesbian, gay and bisexual people are therefore able to serve in the military on the same basis as heterosexual men and women.

In April 2016, Portugal's armed forces chief General Carlos Jerónimo resigned, days after being summoned to explain comments about gay soldiers made by the deputy head of the military college. President Marcelo Rebelo de Sousa accepted the resignation of Jerónimo, who took up the post of chief of staff in 2014. The resignation came after António Grilo, deputy head of the military college, admitted advising parents of young military students in the Portuguese army to withdraw their sons if they were gay "to protect them from the other students". Defence Minister Azeredo Lopes considered any discrimination "absolutely unacceptable".

Conversion therapy
Reports from 10 January 2019 suggested that several psychologists were performing conversion therapy. A few days later, a total of 250 psychologists submitted an open letter to the regulatory Ordem dos Psicólogos demanding an investigation into these pseudoscientific practices. The body affirmed that conversion therapy is malpractice and cannot be justified.

Asylum recognition
Since 30 August 2008, sexual orientation and gender identity have been recognised as grounds to apply for asylum.

Blood donation
In 2010, Parliament unanimously approved a Left Bloc petition to allow gay and bisexual men to donate blood. The motion was to finally be implemented by the Portuguese Institute of Blood and Transplantation in October 2015, and a six-month or one-year deferral period was to be enacted. However, the motion's implementation was delayed. In late September 2016, the new rules came into effect and allow gay and bisexual men to donate blood after one year of abstinence from sex.

In March 2021, in response to controversy in the country after several donations were rejected, the Portuguese Institute of Blood and Transplantation published new guidelines removing all barriers to men who have sex with men from donating blood.

Since the 15th December 2021 is the discrimination based on the sexual orientation, sexual identity and gender expression not allowed, allowing these groups to donate blood.

Living conditions

Although there are several cases of public prejudice against LGBT people, there is a dynamic gay scene in Lisbon, Porto and in the main touristic cities in the Algarve region, such as Faro, Lagos, Albufeira and Tavira, with several gay bars, pubs, nightclubs and beaches. Other smaller cities and regions such as Aveiro, Leiria, Coimbra, Braga, Évora and Madeira have more discreet gay communities. In Lisbon, most LGBT-oriented businesses are grouped around the bohemian Bairro Alto and the adjacent Príncipe Real and Chiado neighbourhoods. In both Lisbon and Porto, there are also annual pride parades that attract thousands of participants and spectators. Lisbon is also host to one of the largest LGBT film festivals in Europe – Queer Lisboa – the Lisbon Gay & Lesbian Film Festival. Some Portuguese beaches are popular among LGBT people, like 19 Beach, near Costa de Caparica, and Barril Naturist Beach (an official naturist beach) or Cacela Velha beach, both of them near Tavira.

Portugal is frequently referred to as one of the world's most LGBT-friendly countries, with various groups and associations catering to LGBT people, supportive legislation and high societal acceptance. In 1974, Portugal transitioned from an authoritarian clerical fascist dictatorship to a civilian democracy. During the dictatorship, LGBT people faced oppression at the hands of the state, as well as prejudice and rejection at the hands of society. Since the transition, however, LGBT people, as well as Portuguese people more broadly, have experienced an increased level of rights, freedom and liberty. Over the following years, LGBT individuals began to organize politically and slowly enter the public eye, raising awareness of their cause and movement. Associação ILGA Portugal was founded in 1995, campaigning for increased legal rights for LGBT people, outlawing discrimination on account of sexual orientation and gender identity and changing societal perceptions. Numerous other groups were established, including Portugal Pride, AMPLOS (Associação de Mães e Pais pela Liberdade de Orientação Sexual) and Pink Panthers (Panteras Rosa), along with a motorcycle group for LGBT people in Porto and an LGBT Catholic association in Lisbon. Owing to their advocacy and work, anti-discrimination laws were expanded to include sexual orientation and gender identity, article 13 of the Constitution of Portugal was similarly amended to prohibit discrimination based on sexual orientation, transgender transition laws were relaxed and civil unions were opened to same-sex couples. In 2010, Portugal legalised same-sex marriage, the eighth country worldwide to do so and the sixth in Europe, and in 2016 same-sex couples became eligible to legally adopt. In 2019, ILGA-Europe ranked Portugal 7th out of 49 European countries in relation to LGBT rights legislation. In March 2019, the country was named the world's best LGBT-friendly travel destination, along with Canada and Sweden.

Public opinion

A Eurobarometer survey published in late 2006 showed that only 29% of Portuguese surveyed supported same-sex marriage and 19% supported the right of same-sex couples to adopt (EU-wide average 44% and 33%).

Opinions on same-sex marriage have considerably changed since then. A 2009 survey by the Catholic University of Portugal revealed that 42% of respondents were in favour of same-sex marriage and another survey by Eurosondagem, Rádio Renascença, SIC TV, and the Expresso newspaper stated that about 52% of the Portuguese public were in favour of same-sex marriages. An Angus Reid poll on 11 January 2010 showed that 45.5% of those polled were in support of same-sex marriage, but this was less than the 49.3% that opposed. A Eurobarometer survey published in 2015 showed that support for same-sex marriage had risen significantly to 61%.

Views on adoption had not been changed significantly at the time same-sex marriage was passed into law: only 21.7% favored adoption, while 68.4% opposed allowing same-sex couples to adopt.
However, in 2014, during parliamentary debates on an initiative to legalize stepchild adoption for same-sex couples, polls showed that a majority of the Portuguese population supported both stepchild adoption and full adoption rights.

A 2020 study found that same-sex couples face significant discrimination in the housing markets of Porto and Lisbon. In similar quality applications for rentals, male same-sex couples received 23 to 26 percent less positive replies than opposite-sex couples, while for female same-sex couples this difference was 10 percent.

Eurobarometer
Below is the share of respondents in Portugal who agreed with the following statements in the 2006, 2015 and 2019 Special Eurobarometer on discrimination. The last column is the change from the previous Eurobarometer. In 2006, respondents were presented with the slightly different statement "Homosexual marriages should be allowed throughout Europe".

Summary table

See also

LGBT history in Portugal
Politics of Portugal
LGBT rights in Europe
 LGBT rights in the European Union

References